Clubionina is a monotypic genus of  sac spiders containing the single species, Clubionina pallida. It was first described by Lucien Berland in 1947, and has only been found on Île Saint-Paul.

References

Clubionidae
Monotypic Araneomorphae genera
Spiders of Oceania
Taxa named by Lucien Berland